John Henry "Harry" Stuckey (3 July 1869 – 10 August 1952) was an Australian cricketer. He played 53 first-class cricket matches for Victoria between 1891 and 1910.

His brother, George, also played cricket for Victoria and was a prominent Australian rules football player.

See also
 List of Victoria first-class cricketers

References

External links
 

1869 births
1952 deaths
Australian cricketers
Victoria cricketers
Cricketers from Victoria (Australia)